The New York City mayoral election of 1981 occurred on Tuesday, November 3, 1981, with Democratic incumbent Mayor Ed Koch being re-elected to a second term by a landslide margin.

Koch won both the Democratic and Republican nominations and appeared on the ballot with both of their lines. He only faced opposition from third parties in the election.

Koch received an overwhelming 74.64% of the vote citywide. Koch also swept all five boroughs by landslide margins, breaking 60% of the vote in Manhattan and breaking 70% of the vote in Brooklyn, the Bronx, Queens and Staten Island.

Koch's closest competitor was the short-lived New York Unity Party nominee Frank J. Barbaro, who received 13.31%.

Finishing in a distant third and fourth were the Conservative Party nominee, John A. Esposito, who received 4.92%, and Liberal Party nominee, Mary T. Codd, who received 3.41%.

Koch defeated his nearest competitor by a landslide 61.35% Democratic margin of victory and was sworn into his second term in January 1982.

Results

Koch had 738,288 Democratic votes  and 174,334 Republican votes.
Others = 45,485. Jeronimo Dominguez – Right to Life – 32,790 2.7%; Judith Jones – Libertarian – 6,902 0.6%; Wells Todd – Socialist Workers – 5,793 0.5%
Koch won the Democratic Primary with 347,351 votes (59.8%), defeating Barbaro who had 209,369 votes (36.0%) and Melvin Klenetsky who had 24,352 votes (4.2%). Koch also won the Republican Primary, defeating Esposito by 44,724 to 22,354.

References

Mayoral election, 1981
1981
New York City mayoral
New York